Stanley Pearson (born 1888) was a professional footballer, who played for Huddersfield Town.

References

1888 births
Year of death missing
English footballers
Footballers from Sheffield
Association football midfielders
English Football League players
Huddersfield Town A.F.C. players